The 2011 Philadelphia Independence season was the team's second and final season in the Women's Professional Soccer league, and its final season as a team.

Review 

The Independence traded Karina LeBlanc to the Chicago Red Stars to move up to the second overall pick in the 2011 WPS Draft and midfielder Caroline Seger to the expansion Western New York Flash for their first pick in the draft's second round. The Independence selected University of Virginia midfielder Sinead Farrelly with the acquired first-round pick. The Independence would select seven players in the draft, more than any other team in the 6-team league. It also signed goalkeeper Nicole Barnhart on February 24, 2011, after the dissolution of FC Gold Pride.

The team also changed home venues, moving from West Chester University to Widener University.

The Independence finished second in league play, won the WPS Super Semifinal 2–0 over magicJack, then drew the Western New York Flash in the 2011 WPS championship after extra time, losing in penalties 5–4. Head coach Paul Riley was named WPS Coach of the Year for the second consecutive season, and Verónica Boquete was named Player of the Year.

This was the team's final season, as it dissolved in 2012 along with the Women's Professional Soccer league itself. Many of its players and staff would go on to other teams that moved to different leagues, while others appeared in the next fully professional women's soccer league, the National Women's Soccer League, after it launched in 2013.

Squad

Roster

As of September 26, 2011

Team Management

Competitions

Women's Professional Soccer

Regular season

Results by round

Home/away results

League table

WPS Playoffs

Squad statistics
Source: WPS

Squad statistics are of the regular season only.

Transfers

2011 WPS Draft

In

Out

Awards

Player of the Week

WPS year-end awards

Source: 2011 WPS Year End Awards

2011 WPS Best XI

* – unanimous selection
Source: WPS Announces Best XI of 2011

See also 

 2011 Women's Professional Soccer season
 2011 Women's Professional Soccer Playoffs

References 

2011
American soccer clubs 2011 season
Philadelphia Independence
Philadelphia Independence